John Caine (born 1946), is a male former athlete who competed for Great Britain and England.

Athletics career
He was an Great Britain and England international and ran long distance races. He trained with Brendan Foster.

He represented England in the 10,000 metres, at the 1970 British Commonwealth Games in Edinburgh, Scotland.

References

1946 births
English male long-distance runners
Athletes (track and field) at the 1970 British Commonwealth Games
Living people
Commonwealth Games competitors for England